= CGS-8216 =

Names
- Preferred IUPAC name 2-Phenyl-1,2-dihydro-3H-pyrazolo[4,3-c]quinolin-3-one

Identifiers
CAS Number	77779-60-3
3D model (JSmol)	Interactive image
ChemSpider	94682
IUPHAR/BPS	4366
PubChem CID	104916
UNII	YXH2C8E92N
CompTox Dashboard (EPA)	DTXSID00998973
- InChI: InChI=1S/C16H11N3O/c20-16-13-10-17-14-9-5-4-8-12(14)15(13)18-19(16)11-6-2-1-3-7-11/h1-10,18H Key: XTYGFVVANLMBHE-UHFFFAOYSA-N; InChI=1/C16H11N3O/c20-16-13-10-17-14-9-5-4-8-12(14)15(13)18-19(16)11-6-2-1-3-7-11/h1-10,18H Key: XTYGFVVANLMBHE-UHFFFAOYAI
- SMILES: O=C3c2cnc1ccccc1c2NN3c4ccccc4

Properties
Chemical formula	C_{16}H_{11}N_{3}O
Molar mass	261.284 g·mol^{−1}
- Except where otherwise noted, data are given for materials in their standard state (at 25 °C [77 °F], 100 kPa). Infobox references

CGS-8216 is an anxiolytic pyrazoloquinoline.
